The 2010 Hungarian Figure Skating Championships took place between December 19 and 20, 2009 at the Budapest Jégcsarnok in Budapest. Skaters competed in the disciplines of men's singles, ladies' singles, pair skating, and ice dancing on the senior and junior levels. The results were used to choose the Hungarian teams to the 2010 World Championships and the 2010 European Championships.

Senior results

Men

Ladies

Pairs

Ice dancing

Junior results

Men

Ladies

 WD = Withdrawn

Pairs

Ice dancing

External links
 2010 Hungarian Figure Skating Championships results
 Hungarian Skating Federation

Hungarian Figure Skating Championships
Hungarian Figure Skating Championships, 2010
2009 in figure skating
2010 in Hungarian sport